Martin Orgoník Kunovský (28 May 1887 – 17 March 1916) was a Slovak poet and writer born in Senica. He was known mainly for "combining text and melody".

Early life 
He was born in the town Senica in the quarter Kunov. Martin had 6 siblings – Pavol, Ján, Štefan, Anna, Katarína, Kristína. 

He started to be interested in books mainly thanks to his father. 

Orgoník-Kunovský fought in World War I in the Austro-Hungarian Army, first on the Serbian Front, then on the Italian Front.

Death 
Orgoník-Kunovský committed suicide in March 1916. He shot himself.

References 

Slovak poets
Slovak writers
1887 births
1916 deaths
People from Senica
1916 suicides
Austro-Hungarian military personnel of World War I
Suicides by firearm in Slovakia